Burgher Recreation Club is a first-class cricket and hockey club based in Colombo, Sri Lanka.

History
The club was founded on 26 December 1896 known as the Bambalapitya Recreation Club, with membership restricted to the Burgher community. The first president was A. W. Raffel, the hon. secretary was O. H. Poppenback and the club captain was V. O. Wright. The club won its first cricket match on 9 November 1901.

In 1902 the club moved from Bambalapitiya to Havelock Park. On 31 May 1915 the club changed its name to the Burgher Recreation Club. In 1925 the club was adjudged cricket champions. In 1947 B. R. Heyn was appointed as the captain of the Sri Lanka national cricket team. In the 1950s the club opened its membership to the wider community. The club won its first P. Saravanamuttu Trophy in the 1955–56 season.

The club competed at first-class level in the Premier Trophy from 1988–89 to 2012–13, but lost its first-class status when the number of teams in the competition was reduced from 20 to 14 after the 2012–13 season. It is eligible for promotion back to first-class status, depending on its results in non-first-class competitions.

Honours
 1955–56 – P Saravanamuttu Trophy

Current squad
These players featured in matches for Burgher Recreation Club in 2019/20

Players with international caps are listed in bold

Hockey Captains
 E. D. KELAART 1924
 A. L. KELLY 1928
 W. L. METZELING 1929–30
 CARL KELAART 1931
 V. S. De KRETSER 1932
 D. O. PEREIRA 1933–34		
 F. WRIGHT 1935–41		
 R. H. ALDONS 1942–43		
 Q. WRIGHT 1944–45		
 Dr. R. H. ALDONS 1946
 Q. WRIGHT 1947	
 Dr. R. H. ALDONS 1948–49
 W. F. De ZYLVA 1950
 E. C. KELAART 1951
 H. C. ALDONS 1951–52
 V. S. De KRETSER 1952–53
 ERIC ALDONS 1954
 B. D. BROWN 1955
 J. C. De KRETSER 1956
 R. I. BARTELS 1957
 E. C. KELAART 1958
 J. C. De KRETSER 1959
 Denis De ROSAYRO 1960
 MALCOM ALDONS 1961
 D. HARVIE 1962–63		
 J. C. De KRETSER 1964
 D. PEIRIS 1965
 RICHARD HEYN 1966–67		
 SAM ABEYASEKERA 1968
 G. H. JAYATISSA 1969
 S. GALAGAMA 1972
 B. M. R. PREENA 1974
 A. K. H. PREENA 1975
 J. M. JHAN 1976
 S. SERASINGHE 1977
 A. M. FAWZIE 1978
 A. J. RUMY 1979
 M. F. RAZEEN 1980
 L. WIJESEKERA 1981
 M. I. SAHABDEEN 1982 
 S. H. M. M. HALLAJ 1983
 S. H. M. KUTHUBDEEN 1984
 S. H. U. KARNAIN 1985
 A. SILVA 1986

Notable players
 Ishara Amerasinghe
 Chinthaka Jayasinghe
 Lanka de Silva
 B. R. Heyn
 Jayantha Paranathala
 Nuwan Pradeep
 Anura Ranasinghe
 Andy Solomons
 Sajeewa Weerakoon

References

External links
 Burgher Recreation Club at CricketArchive
 Cricinfo
 Burgher Recreation Club

Sri Lankan first-class cricket teams
Sports clubs in Colombo